Ski jumping at the 1956 Winter Olympics consisted of one event held on 5 February The competition took place at the Trampolino Olimpico Italia with a K-Point of 72m.

Medal summary

Medal table

Both Finland, which led the medal table, and the unified Germany team won their first Olympic medals in ski jumping.

Events

Results

Participating NOCs
Sixteen nations participated in ski jumping at the Cortina Games. The Soviet Union made its Olympic ski jumping debut.

References

 
1956 Winter Olympics events
1956
1956 in ski jumping
Ski jumping competitions in Italy